The Orange EP and The Purple EP (released in 1999 and 2000, respectively) are promotional EPs by the synthpop band Freezepop, released as CD-Rs. These albums are considered the rarest Freezepop recordings to obtain, according to fans and band members.

Both albums contain versions of songs found on the album Freezepop Forever, including an early version of "Tender Lies", and the track "Science Genius Girl"—a song that can be heard in various music-oriented games, including FreQuency, Karaoke Revolution, and Rock Band.

Track listing 
All tracks written by The Duke of Candied Apples and Liz Enthusiasm except where noted. Track lengths are unknown due to the rarity of the records.

The Orange EP

The Purple EP

Personnel

Performance 
Freezepop:
 The Duke of Candied Apples
 Liz Enthusiasm
 Sean T. Drinkwater

References

External links 
 Freezepop.net

1999 EPs
2000 EPs
Freezepop albums